Cheang Thida is the current president of the Cambodian Alliance of Trade Unions (CATU).

Biography
Cheang Thida was among 11 trade union leaders detained by police on January 21, 2014, during the 2013–2014 Cambodian protests, while trying to deliver a letter to the US embassy in Phnom Penh. According to the Community Legal Education Center, she was detained because she had been "instrumental in leading 10,000 workers on strike in a major garment district, Chak Angre Krom." The detained leaders were released on the same day after signing a letter in which they promised not to participate in further demonstrations. The International Federation for Human Rights expressed its concern over the arrests.

References

Cambodian trade unionists
Cambodian women
Living people
Year of birth missing (living people)
Place of birth missing (living people)